In physics, work is the energy transferred to or from an object via the application of force along a displacement. In its simplest form, for a constant force aligned with the direction of motion, the work equals the product of the force strength and the distance traveled. A force is said to do positive work if when applied it has a component in the direction of the displacement of the point of application. A force does negative work if it has a component opposite to the direction of the displacement at the point of application of the force.

For example, when a ball is held above the ground and then dropped, the work done by the gravitational force on the ball as it falls is positive, and is equal to the weight of the ball (a force) multiplied by the distance to the ground (a displacement). If the ball is thrown upwards, the work done by its weight is negative, and is equal to the weight multiplied by the displacement in the upwards direction.

Work is a scalar quantity, so it has only magnitude and no direction. Work transfers energy from one place to another, or one form to another. The SI unit of work is the joule (J), the same unit as for energy.

History

The ancient Greek understanding of physics was limited to the statics of simple machines (the balance of forces), and did not include dynamics or the concept of work. During the Renaissance the dynamics of the Mechanical Powers, as the simple machines were called, began to be studied from the standpoint of how far they could lift a load, in addition to the force they could apply, leading eventually to the new concept of mechanical work. The complete dynamic theory of simple machines was worked out by Italian scientist Galileo Galilei in 1600 in Le Meccaniche (On Mechanics), in which he showed the underlying mathematical similarity of the machines as force amplifiers. He was the first to explain that simple machines do not create energy, only transform it.

Etymology
According to the 1957 physics textbook by Max Jammer, the term work was introduced in 1826 by the French mathematician Gaspard-Gustave Coriolis as "weight lifted through a height", which is based on the use of early steam engines to lift buckets of water out of flooded ore mines. According to Rene Dugas, French engineer and historian, it is to Solomon of Caux "that we owe the term work in the sense that it is used in mechanics now".  

Although work was not formally used until 1826, similar concepts existed before then.  In 1759, John Smeaton described a quantity that he called "power" "to signify the exertion of strength, gravitation, impulse, or pressure, as to produce motion."  Smeaton continues that this quantity can be calculated if "the weight raised is multiplied by the height to which it can be raised in a given time," making this definition remarkably similar to Coriolis'.

Units
The SI unit of work is the joule (J), named after the 19th-century English physicist James Prescott Joule, which is defined as the work required to exert a force of one newton through a displacement of one metre.

The dimensionally equivalent newton-metre (N⋅m) is sometimes used as the measuring unit for work, but this can be confused with the measurement unit of torque. Usage of N⋅m is discouraged by the SI authority, since it can lead to confusion as to whether the quantity expressed in newton-metres is a torque measurement, or a measurement of work.

Non-SI units of work include the newton-metre, erg, the foot-pound, the foot-poundal, the kilowatt hour, the litre-atmosphere, and the horsepower-hour.  Due to work having the same physical dimension as heat, occasionally measurement units typically reserved for heat or energy content, such as therm, BTU and calorie, are used as a measuring unit.

Work and energy
The work  done by a constant force of magnitude  on a point that moves a displacement  in a straight line in the direction of the force is the product

For example, if a force of 10 newtons acts along a point that travels 2 metres, then . This is approximately the work done lifting a 1 kg object from ground level to over a person's head against the force of gravity.

The work is doubled either by lifting twice the weight the same distance or by lifting the same weight twice the distance.

Work is closely related to energy. The work–energy principle states that an increase in the kinetic energy of a rigid body is caused by an equal amount of positive work done on the body by the resultant force acting on that body. Conversely, a decrease in kinetic energy is caused by an equal amount of negative work done by the resultant force. Thus, if the net work is positive, then the particle’s kinetic energy increases by the amount of the work. If the net work done is negative, then the particle’s kinetic energy decreases by the amount of work.

From Newton's second law, it can be shown that work on a free (no fields), rigid (no internal degrees of freedom) body, is equal to the change in kinetic energy  corresponding to the linear velocity and angular velocity of that body,

The work of forces generated by a potential function is known as potential energy and the forces are said to be conservative. Therefore, work on an object that is merely displaced in a conservative force field, without change in velocity or rotation, is equal to minus the change of potential energy  of the object,

These formulas show that work is the energy associated with the action of a force, so work subsequently possesses the physical dimensions, and units, of energy.
The work/energy principles discussed here are identical to electric work/energy principles.

Constraint forces
Constraint forces determine the object's displacement in the system, limiting it within a range. For example, in the case of a slope plus gravity, the object is stuck to the slope and, when attached to a taut string, it cannot move in an outwards direction to make the string any 'tauter'. It eliminates all displacements in that direction, that is, the velocity in the direction of the constraint is limited to 0, so that the constraint forces do not perform work on the system.

For a mechanical system, constraint forces eliminate movement in directions that characterize the constraint. Thus the virtual work done by the forces of constraint is zero, a result which is only true if friction forces are excluded.

Fixed, frictionless constraint forces do not perform work on the system, as the angle between the motion and the constraint forces is always 90°. Examples of workless constraints are: rigid interconnections between particles, sliding motion on a frictionless surface, and rolling contact without slipping.

For example, in a pulley system like the Atwood machine, the internal forces on the rope and at the supporting pulley do no work on the system. Therefore, work need only be computed for the gravitational forces acting on the bodies. Another example is the centripetal force exerted inwards by a string on a ball in uniform circular motion sideways constrains the ball to circular motion restricting its movement away from the centre of the circle. This force does zero work because it is perpendicular to the velocity of the ball.

The result of a cross product is always perpendicular to both of the original vectors, so . The dot product of two perpendicular vectors is always zero, so the work , and the magnetic force does not do work. It can change the direction of motion but never change the speed.

Mathematical calculation
For moving objects, the quantity of work/time (power) is integrated along the trajectory of the point of application of the force. Thus, at any instant, the rate of the work done by a force (measured in joules/second, or watts) is the scalar product of the force (a vector), and the velocity vector of the point of application. This scalar product of force and velocity is known as instantaneous power. Just as velocities may be integrated over time to obtain a total distance, by the fundamental theorem of calculus, the total work along a path is similarly the time-integral of instantaneous power applied along the trajectory of the point of application.

Work is the result of a force on a point that follows a curve , with a velocity , at each instant.  The small amount of work  that occurs over an instant of time  is calculated as

The sum of these small amounts of work over the trajectory of the point yields the work,

where C is the trajectory from x(t1) to x(t2).  This integral is computed along the trajectory of the particle, and is therefore said to be path dependent.

where  is displacement along the line. If  is constant, in addition to being directed along the line, then the integral simplifies further to

where s is the displacement of the point along the line.

This calculation can be generalized for a constant force that is not directed along the line, followed by the particle.  In this case the dot product , where  is the angle between the force vector and the direction of movement, that is

When a force component is perpendicular to the displacement of the object (such as when a body moves in a circular path under a central force), no work is done, since the cosine of 90° is zero. Thus, no work can be performed by gravity on a planet with a circular orbit (this is ideal, as all orbits are slightly elliptical). Also, no work is done on a body moving circularly at a constant speed while constrained by mechanical force, such as moving at constant speed in a frictionless ideal centrifuge.

Work done by a variable force 

Calculating the work as "force times straight path segment" would only apply in the most simple of circumstances, as noted above. If force is changing, or if the body is moving along a curved path, possibly rotating and not necessarily rigid, then only the path of the application point of the force is relevant for the work done, and only the component of the force parallel to the application point velocity is doing work (positive work when in the same direction, and negative when in the opposite direction of the velocity). This component of force can be described by the scalar quantity called scalar tangential component (where  is the angle between the force and the velocity). And then the most general definition of work can be formulated as follows:

Torque and rotation
A force couple results from equal and opposite forces, acting on two different points of a rigid body.  The sum (resultant) of these forces may cancel, but their effect on the body is the couple or torque T.  The work of the torque is calculated as

The sum of these small amounts of work over the trajectory of the rigid body yields the work,

This integral is computed along the trajectory of the rigid body with an angular velocity  that varies with time, and is therefore said to be path dependent.

If the angular velocity vector maintains a constant direction, then it takes the form,

where  is the angle of rotation about the constant unit vector .  In this case, the work of the torque becomes,

This integral depends on the rotational trajectory , and is therefore path-dependent.

If the torque  is aligned with the angular velocity vector so that,

and both the torque and angular velocity are constant, then the work takes the form,

This result can be understood more simply by considering the torque as arising from a force of constant magnitude , being applied perpendicularly to a lever arm at a distance , as shown in the figure.  This force will act through the distance along the circular arc , so the work done is

Introduce the torque , to obtain

as presented above.

Notice that only the component of torque in the direction of the angular velocity vector contributes to the work.

Work and potential energy
The scalar product of a force  and the velocity  of its point of application defines the power input to a system at an instant of time.  Integration of this power over the trajectory of the point of application, defines the work input to the system by the force.

Path dependence
Therefore, the work done by a force  on an object that travels along a curve  is given by the line integral:

In general this integral requires that the path along which the velocity is defined, so the evaluation of work is said to be path dependent.

The time derivative of the integral for work yields the instantaneous power,

Path independence
If the work for an applied force is independent of the path, then the work done by the force, by the gradient theorem, defines a potential function which is evaluated at the start and end of the trajectory of the point of application. It is tradition to define this function with a negative sign so that positive work is a reduction in the potential, that is

The function  is called the potential energy associated with the applied force.  The force derived from such a potential function is said to be conservative. Examples of forces that have potential energies are gravity and spring forces.

In this case, the gradient of work yields

and the force F is said to be "derivable from a potential."

Because the potential  defines a force  at every point  in space, the set of forces is called a force field.  The power applied to a body by a force field is obtained from the gradient of the work, or potential, in the direction of the velocity  of the body, that is

Work by gravity

In the absence of other forces, gravity results in a constant downward acceleration of every freely moving object. It is convenient to imagine this gravitational force concentrated at the center of mass of the object.

If an object with weight  is displaced upwards or downwards a vertical distance , the work  done on the object is:

where Fg is weight (pounds in imperial units, and newtons in SI units), and Δy is the change in height y. Notice that the work done by gravity depends only on the vertical movement of the object. The presence of friction does not affect the work done on the object by its weight.

Work by gravity in space
The force of gravity exerted by a mass  on another mass  is given by

Notice that the position and velocity of the mass  are given by

This calculation uses the fact that

The function

is the gravitational potential function, also known as gravitational potential energy.  The negative sign follows the convention that work is gained from a loss of potential energy.

Work by a spring

Consider a spring that exerts a horizontal force  that is proportional to its deflection in the x direction independent of how a body moves.  The work of this spring on a body moving along the space with the curve , is calculated using its velocity, to obtain

The work is the product of the distance times the spring force, which is also dependent on distance; hence the  result.

Work by a gas
The work  done by a body of gas on its surroundings is:

Work–energy principle
The principle of work and kinetic energy (also known as the work–energy principle) states that the work done by all forces acting on a particle (the work of the resultant force) equals the change in the kinetic energy of the particle.  That is, the work W done by the resultant force on a particle equals the change in the particle's kinetic energy ,

The derivation of the work–energy principle begins with Newton’s second law of motion and the resultant force on a particle.  Computation of the scalar product of the force with the velocity of the particle evaluates the instantaneous power added to the system.
(Constraints define the direction of movement of the particle by ensuring there is no component of velocity in the direction of the constraint force. This also means the constraint forces do not add to the instantaneous power.) The time integral of this scalar equation yields work from the instantaneous power, and kinetic energy from the scalar product of acceleration with velocity.  The fact that the work–energy principle eliminates the constraint forces underlies Lagrangian mechanics.

This section focuses on the work–energy principle as it applies to particle dynamics.  In more general systems work can change the potential energy of a mechanical device, the thermal energy in a thermal system, or the electrical energy in an electrical device.  Work transfers energy from one place to another or one form to another.

Derivation for a particle moving along a straight line
In the case the resultant force  is constant in both magnitude and direction, and parallel to the velocity of the particle, the particle is moving with constant acceleration a along a straight line. The relation between the net force and the acceleration is given by the equation  (Newton's second law), and the particle displacement  can be expressed by the equation

The work of the net force is calculated as the product of its magnitude and the particle displacement. Substituting the above equations, one obtains:

Other derivation:

In the general case of rectilinear motion, when the net force  is not constant in magnitude, but is constant in direction, and parallel to the velocity of the particle, the work must be integrated along the path of the particle:

General derivation of the work–energy principle for a particle
For any net force acting on a particle moving along any curvilinear path, it can be demonstrated that its work equals the change in the kinetic energy of the particle by a simple derivation analogous to the equation above. It is known as the work–energy principle:

The identity  requires some algebra.
From the identity  and definition 
it follows

The remaining part of the above derivation is just simple calculus, same as in the preceding rectilinear case.

Derivation for a particle in constrained movement
In particle dynamics, a formula equating work applied to a system to its change in kinetic energy is obtained as a first integral of Newton's second law of motion.  It is useful to notice that the resultant force used in Newton's laws can be separated into forces that are applied to the particle and forces imposed by constraints on the movement of the particle.  Remarkably, the work of a constraint force is zero, therefore only the work of the applied forces need be considered in the work–energy principle.

To see this, consider a particle P that follows the trajectory  with a force  acting on it.  Isolate the particle from its environment to expose constraint forces , then Newton's Law takes the form

where  is the mass of the particle.

Vector formulation
Note that n dots above a vector indicates its nth time derivative.
The scalar product of each side of Newton's law with the velocity vector yields

because the constraint forces are perpendicular to the particle velocity.  Integrate this equation along its trajectory from the point  to the point  to obtain

The left side of this equation is the work of the applied force as it acts on the particle along the trajectory from time  to time .  This can also be written as

This integral is computed along the trajectory  of the particle and is therefore path dependent.

The right side of the first integral of Newton's equations can be simplified using the following identity

(see product rule for derivation). Now it is integrated explicitly to obtain the change in kinetic energy,

where the kinetic energy of the particle is defined by the scalar quantity,

Tangential and normal components
It is useful to resolve the velocity and acceleration vectors into tangential and normal components along the trajectory , such that

where

Then, the scalar product of velocity with acceleration in Newton's second law takes the form

where the kinetic energy of the particle is defined by the scalar quantity,

The result is the work–energy principle for particle dynamics,

This derivation can be generalized to arbitrary rigid body systems.

Moving in a straight line (skid to a stop)
The constraint forces between the vehicle and the road define , and we have

Integration of both sides yields

If  is constant along the trajectory, then the integral of velocity is distance, so

As an example consider a car skidding to a stop, where k is the coefficient of friction and W is the weight of the car. The velocity v of the car can be determined from the length  of the skid using the work–energy principle,

Coasting down an inclined surface (gravity racing)
Consider the case of a vehicle that starts at rest and coasts down an inclined surface (such as mountain road), the work–energy principle helps compute the minimum distance that the vehicle travels to reach a velocity , of say 60 mph (88 fps).  Rolling resistance and air drag will slow the vehicle down so the actual distance will be greater than if these forces are neglected.

Let the trajectory of the vehicle following the road be  which is a curve in three-dimensional space.  The force acting on the vehicle that pushes it down the road is the constant force of gravity , while the force of the road on the vehicle is the constraint force .  Newton's second law yields,

The scalar product of this equation with the velocity, yields

The constraint forces between the vehicle and the road cancel from this equation because , which means they do no work.
Integrate both sides to obtain

The weight force W is constant along the trajectory and the integral of the vertical velocity is the vertical distance, therefore,

Recall that V(t1)=0. Notice that this result does not depend on the shape of the road followed by the vehicle.

In order to determine the distance along the road assume the downgrade is 6%, which is a steep road.  This means the altitude decreases 6 feet for every 100 feet traveled—for angles this small the sin and tan functions are approximately equal.  Therefore, the distance  in feet down a 6% grade to reach the velocity  is at least

Work of forces acting on a rigid body
The work of forces acting at various points on a single rigid body can be calculated from the work of a resultant force and torque.  To see this, let the forces F1, F2, ..., Fn act on the points X1, X2, ..., Xn in a rigid body.

The trajectories of Xi, i = 1, ..., n are defined by the movement of the rigid body.  This movement is given by the set of rotations [A(t)] and the trajectory d(t) of a reference point in the body.  Let the coordinates xi i = 1, ..., n define these points in the moving rigid body's reference frame M, so that the trajectories traced in the fixed frame F are given by

The velocity of the points  along their trajectories are

where  is the angular velocity vector obtained from the skew symmetric matrix

known as the angular velocity matrix.

The small amount of work by the forces over the small displacements  can be determined by approximating the displacement by  so

or

This formula can be rewritten to obtain

where F and T are the resultant force and torque applied at the reference point d of the moving frame M in the rigid body.

References

Bibliography

External links
 Work–energy principle

Energy properties
Scalar physical quantities
Mechanical engineering
Mechanics
Force
Length